The King Talal Dam is a large dam in the hills of northern Jordan, across the Zarqa River. The dam was started in 1971, with the original construction being completed in 1978 at a height of 92.5 meters. The original dam cost $46 million and was partially funded by a $16.8 million loan from the Arab Fund for Economic and Social Development and a $5.6 million grant from the Abu Dhabi Fund. Energoprojekt of Yugoslavia was the consultant and Planum of Yugoslavia was the contractor.

In 1984, to meet the country's increased water demands, work to raise the dam to a height of 106 meters was begun, a project that was completed in 1988. The dam is named after king Talal of Jordan. The main purpose of the dam is to store winter rains and treated wastewater from Amman and Zarqa treated in the As Samra plant for irrigation in the Jordan Valley. The dam irrigates about 17,000 hectares and supports the livelihood of 120,000 people.dam

References

External links 

 

Geography of Jordan
Dams in Jordan
Dams completed in 1977
Hydroelectric power stations in Jordan
Energy infrastructure completed in 1978
Jordan River basin